This is a list of negative or anti-awards and mock prizes.

Arts and entertainment
 Bad Sex in Fiction Award, awarded by the British magazine Literary Review
 Bald Archy Prize, an Australian art prize, parodying the Australian Archibald Prize and mocking Australian celebrities
 Barbara Dex Award, given annually to the "worst dressed" artist in the Eurovision Song Contest
 Bunshun Kiichigo Awards, for the worst Japanese and foreign films
 Bulwer-Lytton Fiction Contest, for the deliberately worst written opening sentence for a (non-existent) novel
 Faux Faulkner contest, for parodying William Faulkner
 Filmfail Awards, for the biggest failures of Bollywood
 Ghanta Awards, recognizing the worst in Bollywood in various categories
 Golden Kela Awards, spotlighting the worst performances in Hindi cinema
 Golden Raspberry Awards, for the worst in American cinema
 Golden Mullet Awards, reviewers' picks for worst video games of the past year
 K Foundation art award, presented to the "worst artist of the year"
 Lyttle Lytton Contest, based on the Bulwer-Lytton Fiction Contest, but with restrictions
 Naomi Awards, dedicated to the year's worst music acts
 Stinkers Bad Movie Awards, chosen by a Los Angeles-based group of film buffs and movie critics
 Turnip Prize, for deliberately bad modern art

Language and speaking
 Académie de la Carpette anglaise, to "members of the French élite who distinguish themselves by relentlessly promoting the domination of the English language over the French language in France and in European institutions."
 Doublespeak Award, an "ironic tribute to public speakers who have perpetuated language that is grossly deceptive, evasive, euphemistic, confusing, or self-centered"
 Ernie Awards, for comments deemed misogynistic
 Foot in Mouth Award, for "a baffling comment by a public figure"
 Golden Bull Award, for organizations which use confusing and bad English
 Un-word of the year, for a German word or word group deemed to be the year's most offensive new or recently popularized term
 Word of the year, including "most unnecessary", "most outrageous", "most euphemistic", "least likely to succeed"

Science and pseudoscience
 Allergen of the Year
 Bent Spoon Award for paranormal or pseudo-scientific fraud
 Erratic Boulder Award (orig. Bludný Balvan), for the contribution of individuals and societies in misleading the Czech public and the development of a muddy way of thinking
 Goldenes Brett, for the most astonishing pseudo-scientific nuisance of the year in German-speaking countries
 Ig Nobel Prize, started off as an award for questionable scientific achievements, but evolved to a honourable award with the slogan 'honor achievements that first make people laugh, and then make them think'.
 Pigasus Award, for paranormal fraud, presented by noted skeptic James Randi
 Snuffed Candle Award for presenting pseudoscience as genuine

Sports
 The Gooker Award, given each year to the worst gimmick, storyline, match or event in professional wrestling in that year.
 Bidone d'oro, for the most disappointing player in Serie A Italian football league
 Douglas Wilkie Medal, presented to those who do the least for Australian rules football
 Mr. Irrelevant, for the last player selected in each year's NFL draft
 Wooden spoon (award), usually given to an individual or team which has come last in a competition, but sometimes also to runners-up

Other 
 Big Brother Awards, to recognize "the government and private sector organizations ... which have done the most to threaten personal privacy"
 Big Brother Awards (Australia)
 Big Brother Awards (Finland)
 Big Brother Awards (Italy)
 Big Brother Awards (United Kingdom)
 Carbuncle Cup, for bad architecture
 Darwin Awards, for removing oneself from the gene pool (i.e. killing oneself) in an unusual fashion
 Fake News Awards, created by Donald Trump to highlight news outlets he claimed were responsible for misrepresenting him or producing false reports
 Golden Fleece Award, for financial waste within the U.S. government
 Herman Cain Award, for people who have promoted COVID-19 misinformation and later died of COVID-19
 Pwnie Awards, recognizing both excellence and incompetence in the field of information security
 Roger Award, for the worst transnational corporation operating in New Zealand
 Salt Lick Award, given to Canadian manufacturers of foods that have high sodium levels
 Shafta Awards (journalism), British awards given annually for "the very worst in tabloid journalism"
 Sir Hugh Casson Award, for the worst new building of the year
 Stella Awards, now defunct, for frivolous lawsuits
 Wet Gunpowder Award, Iranian award given to "someone who is against the Islamic Revolution" and who "against their own wishes, performs a service to the revolution."

See also 
 Lists of awards

mocking awards